Lebanese Nigerians are Nigerians with ancestry from Lebanon. They form a community of 30,000-75,000. Some Lebanese families in Nigeria have lived in the country for multiple generations since the British colonial era, while others are more recent immigrants.

History

Colonial era
People from Lebanon first migrated to West Africa in the 19th-century to flee oppression and economic crisis in the Ottoman Empire. Lebanese migrants often originally intended to reach Brazil or the United States, but many were stranded in West Africa due to financial or logistical problems. Nigeria received a significant amount of Lebanese settlers due to its coastal city of Lagos serving as a major point of transit between Lebanon and the Americas.The first Lebanese immigrant to Nigeria, in Lagos, was Elias Khoury who migrated from the Lebanese village of Miziara in 1890. Many of these early Lebanese migrants to Nigeria came from the villages of Miziara and Jwaya. Residents of the two villages often rely on remittances from Lebanese Nigerians to survive.

Contemporary
Nigeria continues to receive a significant influx of Lebanese immigrants seeking to escape political and economic turmoil in their homeland. It is estimated that more than 250,000 Lebanese live in West Africa, and in 2021, the Lebanese embassy in Nigeria reported a “noticeable increase” in Lebanese citizens moving to Nigeria. In February 2022, the Nigerian government granted citizenship to 286 foreign nationals, 108 of whom were Lebanese.

Impact on Nigerian society
Tinubu Square, an open space landmark in Lagos, was donated by the Lebanese community as a gift for Nigeria upon Nigerian independence in 1960. The Lebanese Community School is a private school in Lagos operated by the Lebanese.

List of notable Lebanese-Nigerians
Michael Boulos
Ely Calil
George Calil
George Calil (businessman)
Gilbert Chagoury
Ronald Chagoury
Sam Darwish
Bilal Fawaz
Mimi Fawaz
Anwar M. El-Khalil
May El-Khalil
Lola Maja
Nicole Moudaber
Laila St. Matthew-Daniel
Hassan El Mohamad

See also 
 Lebanese diaspora
 List of Lebanese people in Africa

References 

Lebanese diaspora in Africa
Immigrants to Nigeria